Evoğlu or Evogly may refer to:
Evoğlu, Agdam, Azerbaijan
Evoğlu, Tartar, Azerbaijan

Also:
 Ivughli, in Iran